Roudebush is a surname. Notable people with the surname include:

George Roudebush (1894–1992), American football player 
James G. Roudebush (born 1948), United States Air Force Surgeon General
Richard L. Roudebush (1918–1995), American politician

See also
Meanings of minor planet names: 2001–3000#978